Micromax Canvas HD A116 is a dual-sim Android phablet by Micromax Mobile which is a rebranded Wiko Cink Five superseding the Micromax Canvas 2 A110. The device was exclusively launched with Snapdeal.com also found in Facebook for the advertisements on 14 February 2013 with featuring a 1.2 GHz Quad-core processor, 1 GB of RAM and a 5.0 IPS LCD (HD) screen.

Design
Micromax Canvas HD has a large 5 inch IPS LCD screen with resolution of 1280x720. The screen is protected by AGC Sodalime scratch resistant coating but as compared to Corning Gorilla Glass it's not too efficient in protecting the display of this phablet. The bottom has 3 capacitive haptic feedback buttons -MENU, HOME, BACK. The phone is curved at the edges and the back panel is made of plastic with glossy or matte white finish. On the top there is a 3.5mm jack for headphones and a Micro USB port for data transfer and charging. The phone has a Micromax branding, 8MP auto focus LED flash at the back. There is a 2 MP secondary front camera for video calls. There is a light sensor to control the screen brightness. Notification LED beside the ear speaker, Volume rocker to the left with a secondary microphone beside the rear camera and speaker grill at bottom back side..

Hardware
Micromax A116 Canvas HD is powered by MediaTek MT6589 quad ARM Cortex A7 CPU and PowerVR SGX544MP2 GPU. It has 1 GB RAM, 4 GB ROM and micro SD card slot expandable up to 32 GB. It has 0.96 GB free for apps and 1.7 GB free for mass storage. It has 8 Mega pixel rear and 2 mega pixel front camera. 
It is a 720p HD smartphone.

See also
 Samsung Galaxy SIII
Samsung Galaxy Grand
 Micromax Canvas 2 A110
 List of Android devices

References

Micromax Mobile
Android (operating system) devices
Smartphones
Mobile phones introduced in 2013
Discontinued smartphones